A frozen meal (also called TV dinner (Canada and US), prepackaged meal, ready-made meal, ready meal (UK), frozen dinner, and microwave meal) is a packaged frozen meal that comes portioned for an individual. A frozen meal in the United States and Canada usually consists of a type of meat for the main course, and sometimes vegetables, potatoes, and/or a dessert. The main dish can also be pasta or fish. In European frozen meals, Indian and Chinese meals are common. Another form of convenience food, which is merely a refrigerated ready meal that requires less heating but expires sooner, is popular in the UK.

The term TV dinner, which has become common, was first used as part of a brand of packaged meals developed in 1953 by the company C.A. Swanson & Sons (the full name was TV Brand Frozen Dinner).  The original TV Dinner came in an aluminum tray and was heated in an oven.  In the US and Canada, the term is synonymous with any packaged meal or dish ("dinner") purchased frozen in a supermarket and heated at home. In 1986, the Campbell Soup Company introduced the microwave-safe tray. Consequently, today, most frozen food trays are made of a microwaveable and disposable material, usually plastic or coated cardboard.

History

Several smaller companies had conceived of frozen dinners earlier (see Invention section below), but the first to achieve success was Swanson. The first Swanson-brand TV Dinner was produced in the United States and consisted of a Thanksgiving meal of turkey, cornbread dressing, frozen peas and sweet potatoes packaged in a tray like those used at the time for airline food service. Each item was placed in its own compartment. The trays proved to be useful: the entire dinner could be removed from the outer packaging as a unit, the tray with its aluminum foil covering could be heated directly in the oven without any extra dishes, and one could eat the meal directly from the tray. The original TV Dinner sold for 98 cents, and had a production estimate of 5,000 dinners for the first year.

The name "TV dinner" was coined by Gerry Thomas, its inventor. At the time it was introduced, televisions were status symbols and a growing medium. Thomas thought the name "TV Dinner" sounded like the product was made for convenience (which it was), and the Swanson executives agreed.

Much has changed since the first TV Dinners were marketed. For instance, a wider variety of main courses – such as fried chicken, spaghetti, Salisbury steak and Mexican combinations – have been introduced. Competitors such as Banquet and Morton began offering prepackaged frozen dinners at a lower price than Swanson. Other changes include:
 1960 – Swanson added desserts (such as apple cobbler and brownies) to a new four-compartment tray.
 1969 – The first TV breakfasts were marketed (pancakes and sausage were the favorites). Great Starts Breakfasts and breakfast sandwiches (such as egg and Canadian bacon) followed later.
 1973 – The first Swanson "Hungry-Man" dinners were marketed; these contained  larger portions of its regular dinners. The American football player "Mean" Joe Greene was the "Hungry-Man" spokesman.
 1986 – The first microwave oven-safe trays were marketed.

Modern-day frozen dinners tend to come in microwave-safe containers. Product lines also tend to offer a larger variety of dinner types. These dinners, also known as microwave meals, can be purchased at most supermarkets. They are stored frozen. To prepare them, the plastic cover is removed or vented, and the meal is heated in a microwave oven for a few minutes. They are convenient since they essentially require no preparation time other than the heating, although some frozen dinners may require the preparer to briefly carry out an intermediate step (such as stirring mashed potatoes midway through the heating cycle) to ensure adequate heating and uniform consistency of component items.

In the United Kingdom, prepared frozen meals first became widely available in the late 1970s. Since then they have steadily grown in popularity with the increased ownership of home freezers and microwave ovens. Demographic trends such as the growth of smaller households have also influenced the sale of this and other types of convenience food. In 2003, the United Kingdom spent £5 million a day on ready meals, and was the largest consumer in Europe.

Unfrozen pre-cooked ready meals, which are merely chilled and require less time to reheat, are also popular and are sold by most supermarkets. Chilled ready meals are intended for immediate reheating and consumption. Although most can be frozen by the consumer after purchase, they can either be heated from frozen or may have to be fully defrosted before reheating.

Many different varieties of frozen and chilled ready meals are now generally available in the UK, including "gourmet" recipes, organic and vegetarian dishes, traditional British and foreign cuisine, and smaller children's meals.

Invention

The identity of the TV Dinner's inventor has been disputed. In one account, first publicized in 1996, retired Swanson executive Gerry Thomas said he conceived the idea after the company found itself with a huge surplus of frozen turkeys because of poor Thanksgiving sales. Thomas' version of events has been challenged by the Los Angeles Times, members of the Swanson family  and former Swanson employees. They credit the Swanson brothers with the invention.

Betty Cronin, a bacteriologist employed at C. A. Swanson and Sons, has also been credited with important contributions to the invention. She was involved in the technical design of dinner items that could be frozen then re-heated successfully.

Swanson's concept was not original. In 1944, William L. Maxson's frozen dinners were being served on airplanes. Other prepackaged meals were also marketed before Swanson's TV Dinner. In 1948, plain frozen fruits and vegetables were joined by what were then called 'dinner plates' with a main course, potato, and vegetable. In 1952 the first frozen dinners on oven-ready aluminum trays were introduced by Quaker States Foods under the One-Eyed Eskimo label. Quaker States Foods was joined by other companies including Frigi-Dinner, which offered such fare as beef stew with corn and peas, veal goulash with peas and potatoes, and chicken chow mein with egg rolls and fried rice. Swanson, a large producer of canned and frozen poultry in Omaha, Nebraska, was able to promote the widespread sales and adaptation of frozen dinner by using its nationally recognized brand name with an extensive national marketing campaign nicknamed "Operation Smash" and the clever advertising name of "TV Dinner," which tapped into the public's excitement around the new device.

Manufacturing
The production process of frozen meals is highly automated and undergoes three major steps. Those steps are food preparation, tray loading, and freezing. During food preparation, vegetables and fruits are usually placed on a movable belt and washed, then are placed into a container to be steamed or boiled for 1–3 minutes. This process is referred to as blanching, and is used as a method to destroy enzymes in the food that can cause chemical changes negatively affecting overall flavor and color of the fruit and vegetables. As for meats, prior to cooking, they are trimmed of fat and cut into proper sizes. The fish is usually cleaned and cut into fillets, and poultry is usually washed thoroughly and dressed. Meats are then seasoned, placed on trays, and are cooked in an oven for a predetermined amount of time. After all the food is ready to be packaged, it is sent to the filling lines. The food is placed in its compartments as the trays pass under numerous filling machines; to ensure that every packaged dinner gets an equal amount of food, the filling devices are strictly regulated.

The food undergoes a process of cryogenic freezing with liquid nitrogen. After the food is placed on the conveyor belt, it is sprayed with liquid nitrogen that boils on contact with the freezing food. This method of flash-freezing fresh foods is used to retain natural quality of the food. When the food is chilled through cryogenic freezing, small ice crystals are formed throughout the food that, in theory, can preserve the food indefinitely if stored safely. Cryogenic freezing is widely used as it is a method for rapid freezing, requires almost no dehydration, excludes oxygen thus decreasing oxidative spoilage, and causes less damage to individual freezing pieces. Due to the fact that the cost of operating cryogenic freezing is high, it is commonly used for high value food products such as TV dinners, which is a $4.5 billion industry a year that is continuing to grow with the constant introduction of new technology.

Following this, the dinners are either covered with aluminum foil or paper, and the product is tightly packed with a partial vacuum created to ensure no evaporation takes place that can cause the food to dry out. Then the packaged dinners are placed in a refrigerated storage facility, transported by refrigerated truck, and stored in the grocer's freezer. TV dinners prepared with the aforementioned steps—that is, frozen and packaged properly—can remain in near-perfect condition for a long time, so long as they are stored at  during shipping and storage.

Health concerns

Frozen meals are often heavily processed with extra salt and fat to make foods last longer. In addition, stabilizing the product for a long period typically means that companies will use partially hydrogenated vegetable oils for some items (typically dessert). Partially hydrogenated vegetable oils are high in trans fats and are shown to adversely affect  cardiovascular health. The dinners are almost always significantly less nutritious than fresh food and are formulated to remain edible after long periods of storage, thus often requiring preservatives such as butylated hydroxytoluene. There is, however, some variability between brands.

In recent years there has been a push by a number of independent manufacturers and retailers to make meals that are low in salt and fat and free of artificial additives. In the UK, most British supermarkets also produce their own "healthy eating" brands. Nearly all chilled or frozen ready meals sold in the UK are now clearly labeled with the salt, sugar and fat content and the recommended daily intake. Concern about obesity and government publicity initiatives such as those by the Food Standards Agency  and the National Health Service  have encouraged manufacturers to reduce the levels of salt and fat in ready prepared food.

See also

 Banquet Foods
 Bento
 Freezer Queen
 Swanson
 Frozen pizza
 Field ration

References

External links

 The frozen, chilled and ready made foods industry – business information at the British Library website
 Healthy Frozen Dinners – an AskMen review of various options in the United States

American inventions
Brands that became generic
Convenience foods
Frozen food
Dinner
Serving and dining